Travel Photographer of the Year (TPOTY) is an international travel photography award, founded by professional photographer Chris Coe and his partner Karen Coe in 2003. The competition runs annually and is open to entries from photographers of all ages and abilities. Each year an overall winner is presented with the 'Travel Photographer of The Year' award, with additional winners selected from each of the year's categories. The competition is judged by an international panel of expert photographers and editors, assessing as many as 20,000 entries from over 142 different countries each year.

Since 2011, winning images (alongside runners-up) have been displayed in major TPOTY-held exhibitions in central London at venues such as the Royal Geographical Society and the University of Greenwich, and published in an accompanying series of Journey portfolio books.

Exhibitions 
In 2011 TPOTY entered into a 5-year agreement with the Royal Geographical Society to 'host major annual exhibitions of the awards’ travel photography' annually in South Kensington alongside events and workshops.

In 2016 TPOTY re-located to the University of Greenwich, signing a 2-year agreement to display the 2016 and 2017 exhibitions at the university's Stockwell Street campus.

For 2018 and 2019, the TPOTY exhibitions were hosted as 24-hour, open-air displays at London Bridge City.

Journey books

Winners 
The overall winner is the photographer who has submitted the best images in two different portfolio categories. A young overall winner is also chosen. In addition, there are winners, runners-up, highly commended and commended entrants in all categories.

Travel Photographer of the Year

Young Travel Photographer of the Year

Additional winners

2018

2017

2016

2015

References

External links 

Awards established in 2003
Photography awards